The 2011 Maryland Terrapins football team represented the University of Maryland in the 2011 NCAA Division I FBS football season. It was the Terrapins' 59th season as a member of the Atlantic Coast Conference (ACC) and its seventh within the ACC's Atlantic Division.

After leading a significant turnaround in 2010 from the worst season in school history in 2009, Ralph Friedgen did not return for his 11th season as head coach.  Maryland's out-of-conference schedule included a continuation of the long-standing rivalry with West Virginia and a neutral site game against Notre Dame at the Washington Commanders' stadium, FedExField in nearby Landover as well as a game against in-state FCS opponent Towson.

Schedule

Coaching Staff

Notes

References

Maryland
Maryland Terrapins football seasons
Maryland Terrapins football